Drive Me Wild is the thirteenth studio album by the American country music band Sawyer Brown. It was released on March 2, 1999 on the Curb Records label. The album produced three singles on the Billboard country charts: the title track at #6, "I'm in Love with Her" at #47, and "800 Pound Jesus" at #40.

Track listing

Personnel 
Sawyer Brown
 Mark Miller – lead vocals
 Gregg "Hobie" Hubbard – keyboards, backing vocals
 Duncan Cameron – lead guitars, backing vocals
 Jim Scholton – bass
 Joe "Curley" Smyth – drums

Additional musicians
 Mike Lawler – synthesizers
 Blair Masters – keyboards
 Steve Nathan – keyboards
 Bob Patin – acoustic piano
 Matt Rollings – acoustic piano
 Pete Wasner – keyboards
 Scotty Emerick – acoustic guitar
 Derek George – electric guitar
 Mac McAnally – acoustic guitar
 Randy Scruggs – acoustic guitar
 Lee Hendricks – bass 
 David Hood – bass
 Eddie Bayers – drums
 Taz Bentley – drums
 Roger Hawkins – drums, percussion
 Paul Leim – drums, percussion
 Lynn Williams – drums
 Jimmy Myers – percussion
 Robert Greenidge – steel drums
 Doug Henry – woodwinds
 Stuart Duncan – fiddle
 John Catchings – cello
 Kristin Wilkinson – viola
 David Davidson – violin
 Connie Heard – violin
 Bob Bailey – backing vocals
 Lisa Cochran – backing vocals
 Vicki Hampton – backing vocals
 Buddy Ross – backing vocals 
 Bryan White – backing vocals

Production 
 Mark A. Miller – producer 
 Mac McAnally – producer
 Alan Schulman – recording, mixing 
 Brian Tankersley – recording, mixing 
 Bob Blesius – additional recording 
 Chris Acton – recording assistant 
 Tyler Gish – recording assistant, mix assistant 
 Sandy Jenkins – recording assistant, mix assistant 
 Steve Lowery – recording assistant, mix assistant 
 Rich Schrimer – recording assistant, mix assistant 
 Chris Stone – recording assistant, mix assistant 
 Craig White – recording assistant, mix assistant 
 Denny Purcell – mastering 
 Monica Mercer – art direction, design 
 Dean Dixon – photography

Chart performance

Weekly charts

Year-end charts

External links
[ Drive Me Wild] at Allmusic

References

1999 albums
Curb Records albums
Sawyer Brown albums
Albums produced by Mac McAnally